Sixteen members of the International Cricket Council (ICC) fielded teams at the 2006 Under-19 Cricket World Cup in Sri Lanka. One team, the United States, was making its tournament debut.

Australia

Coach:  Brian McFadyen

 Moises Henriques (c)
 Jackson Bird
 Tom Cooper
 Ben Cutting
 Aaron Finch
 Jon Holland
 Simon Keen
 Usman Khawaja
 Jack McNamara
 Adam Ritchard
 Will Sheridan
 Tom Stray
 Matthew Wade
 David Warner

Source: Sri Lanka Sports

Bangladesh

Coach:  Allister de Winter

 Mushfiqur Rahim (c)
 Dolar Mahmud
 Ishraq Sonet
 Kazi Kamrul Islam
 Mehdi Hasan Maruf
 Mehrab Hossain 
 Nabil Samad
 Raqibul Hasan
 Rezaul Islam
 Shakib Al Hasan
 Shamsur Rahman
 Sirajullah Khadim
 Suhrawadi Shuvo
 Tamim Iqbal

Source: Sri Lanka Sports

England

Coach:  Andy Pick

 Moeen Ali
 Varun Chopra
 Rory Hamilton-Brown 
 Nicholas James
 Andrew Miller
 Steven Mullaney
 Mark Nelson
 John Simpson
 Mark Stoneman
 Huw Waters
 Graeme White
 Greg Wood
 Robert Woodman
 Ben Wright

Source: Sri Lanka Sports

India

Coach:  Venkatesh Prasad

 Ravikant Shukla (c)
 Rohit Sharma 
 Ravindra Jadeja
 Cheteshwar Pujara
 Piyush Chawla
 Saurabh Bandekar
 Pranabesh Paul(wk)
 Shahbaz Nadeem
 Abu Nechim
 Monish Parmar
 Pinal Shah 
 Gaurav Dhiman
 Mayank Tehlan
 Vijaykumar Yo Mahesh
  Ishant Sharma

Source: Sri Lanka Sports

Ireland

Coach:  Adrian Birrell

 Eoin Morgan (c)
 Neil Gill
 James Hall
 Richard Keaveney 
 Gary Kidd
 Fintan McAllister
 Niall McDarby
 Gareth McKee
 Gavin McKenna
 Andrew Poynter
 David Rankin
 Richard Stirling
 Greg Thompson
 Gary Wilson

Source: Sri Lanka Sports

Namibia

Coach:  Andy Waller

 Stephanus Ackermann (c)
 Jason Bandlow
 Dawid Botha
 Morne Engelbrecht
 Pieter Grove
 Andrew Louw
 Floris Marx
 Hendrik Marx
 Marc Olivier
 Henno Prinsloo
 Nicolaas Scholtz
 Ewaid Steenkamp
 Keady Strauss
 Louis van der Westhuizen

Source: Sri Lanka Sports

Nepal

Coach:  Roy Dias

 Bantu Bataju
 Amrit Bhattarai
 Prem Chaudhary
 Kanishka Chaugai
 Mahesh Chhetri
 Sashi Kesari
 Paras Khadka
 Gyanendra Malla
 Abhaya Rana
 Ratan Rauniyar
 Basanta Regmi
 Raj Shrestha
 Yashwant Subedi
 Sharad Vesawker

Source: Sri Lanka Sports

New Zealand

Coach:  Dipak Patel

 Marc Ellison (c)
 Todd Astle
 Dean Bartlett
 Hamish Bennett
 Andrew de Boorder
Jason Donnelly
 Nicolas Fitzgerald
 Shaun Fitzgibbon
 Martin Guptill
 Roneel Hira
 Ronald Karaitiana
 Colin Munro
 Kieran Noema-Barnett
 Tim Southee

Source: Sri Lanka Sports

Pakistan

Coach:  Mansoor Rana

 Sarfraz Ahmed (c)
 Akhtar Ayub
 Fahad Mengal
 Ali Khan
 Anwar Ali
 Imad Wasim
 Jamshed Ahmed
 Mohammad Faheem
 Mohammad Ibrahim
 Mohammad Laeeq
 Nasir Jamshed
 Rameez Raja
 Riaz Kail

Source: Sri Lanka Sports

Scotland

Coach:  Peter Drinnen

 Kasiam Farid (c)
 Richie Berrington
 David Bill
 Tyler Buchan
 Robert Cannon
 Gordon Goudie
 Andrew Hislop
 Moneeb Iqbal
 Scott MacLennan
 Calum MacLeod
 Aamir Mehmond
 Umair Mohammed
 Rajeev Routray
 Sean Weeraratna

Source: Sri Lanka Sports

South Africa

Coach:  Russell Domingo

 Dean Elgar (c)
 Craig Alexander
 Pieter Daneel
 Richard das Neves
 Craig Kieswetter
 Richard Levi
 Grant Mokoena
 Wayne Parnell
 Romano Ramoo
 Mafinki Serame
 Mthokozisi Shezi
 Malusi Siboto
 Jean Symes
 Brett Thompson

Source: Sri Lanka Sports

Sri Lanka

Coach:  Sumithra Warnakulasuriya

 Dilhan Cooray
 Sameera de Zoysa
 Hans Fernando
 Chathupama Gunasinghe
 Dimuth Karunaratne
 Shalika Karunanayake
 Angelo Mathews
 Sachith Pathirana
 Prabuddha Perera
 Tissara Perera
 Ashan Priyanjan
 Malinda Pushpakumara
 Sachithra Serasinghe
 Rajeewa Weerasinghe

Source: Sri Lanka Sports

Uganda

 Hamza Almuzahim
 Davis Arinaitwe
 Emmanuel Isaneez
 Arthur Kyobe
 Roger Mukasa
 Dennis Musali
 Emmanuel Nakaana
 Patrick Ochan
 Jimmy Okello
 Raymond Otim
 Danniel Ruyange
 Mauneek Solanki
 Ronald Ssemanda
 Charles Waiswa

Source: Sri Lanka Sports

United States

Coach:  Larry Gomes

 Hemant Punoo (c)
 Dominic Audain
 Sumon Bari
 Romeno Deane
 Anil Deopersaud
 Akeem Dodson
 Alexandrino Kirton
 Dunae Nathaniel
 Mrunal Patel
 Nisarg Patel
 Abhimanyu Rajp
 Kumar Ramsabad
 Mohammad Rehman
 Ravi Timbawala

Source: Sri Lanka Sports

West Indies

Coach:  Roddy Estwick

 Leon Johnson (c)
 Rishi Bachan
 Shamarh Brooks
 Andre Fletcher
 Jason Mohammed
 Andre McCarthy
 Sunil Narine
 Nelon Pascal
 William Perkins
 Kieron Pollard
 Richard Ramdeen
 Kemar Roach
 Javon Searles
 Gajanand Singh

Source: Sri Lanka Sports

Zimbabwe

Coach:  Walter Chawaguta

 Sean Williams
 Gary Ballance
 Ronald Benade
 Chamu Chibhabha
 Graeme Cremer
 Ryan Higgins
 Friday Kasteni
 Tarisai Mahlunge
 Prince Masvaure
 Keagan Meth
 Taurai Muzarabani
 Ian Nicolson
 Glen Querl
 Donald Samunderu

Source: Sri Lanka Sports

Sources
 Team averages, ICC Under-19 World Cup 2005/06 – CricketArchive
 Statistics, ICC Under-19 World Cup 2005/06 – ESPNcricinfo

ICC Under-19 Cricket World Cup squads
2006 ICC Under-19 Cricket World Cup